The 2014–15 Elon Phoenix men's basketball team represented Elon University during the 2014–15 NCAA Division I men's basketball season. The Phoenix, led by sixth year head coach Matt Matheny, played their home games at Alumni Gym and were first year members of the Colonial Athletic Association. They finished the season 15–18, 6–12 in CAA play to finish in eighth place. They advanced to the quarterfinals of the CAA tournament where they lost to William & Mary.

Previous season 
The Phoenix finished the season 18–14, 11–5 in SoCon play to finish in a tie for third place. They lost in the quarterfinals of the SoCon tournament to Western Carolina.

Departures

Recruiting

Roster

Schedule

|-
!colspan=9 style="background:#910028; color:#CDB87D;"| Exhibition

|-
!colspan=9 style="background:#910028; color:#CDB87D;"| Regular season

|-
!colspan=9 style="background:#910028; color:#CDB87D;"| CAA tournament
|-

See also
2014–15 Elon Phoenix women's basketball team

References

Elon Phoenix men's basketball seasons
Elon